The electoral district of Hobart Town was a multi-member electoral district of the Tasmanian House of Assembly. It was based in Tasmania's capital city, Hobart, and its suburbs.

The seat was created as a five-member seat ahead of the Assembly's first election held in 1856, and was abolished at the 1871 election, when it was divided up into the seats of Central, East, North, South and West Hobart.

The seat was later recombined in 1897 as the seat of Hobart.

Members for Hobart Town

References
 
 
 Parliament of Tasmania (2006). The Parliament of Tasmania from 1956

Hobart Town